The Zeilberg is a hill, in the Haßberge Nature Park and county of Haßberge in eastern Lower Franconia, about  east of Maroldsweisach. It is one of the few still recognisable volcanoes of the Heldburger Gangschar and gives its name to the Zeilberge, which are the highest part of the Itz-Baunach Hills that are geologically part of the actual Haßberge to the west, but are separated from them by the Baunach valley.

The extinct volcano is 16 million years old and is formed of nephelinite. It has been reduced in height due to extraction from a basalt quarry.

Tourism 
An adventure trail runs around the basalt quarry. The Haus am Zeilberg is also a popular venue for events.

References 

Hills of Bavaria
Volcanoes of Germany